Sizzler may refer to:

People 
 George Sisler (1893 – 1973), American baseball player nicknamed "The Sizzler"
 Sizzla (born 1976), Jamaican reggae musician

Arts, entertainment, and media

Games and toys
 Sizzler (Hot Lotto), the optional tripler for non-jackpot prizes in the lottery game Hot Lotto (known as "Triple Sizzler" in  the North Dakota Lottery)
 Sizzler, a magnetic toy
 Sizzler, a laser gun from the game Aquanox
 Sizzler, the award given to a game rated from 90-95% in the 1980s C64 gaming magazine ZZAP!64
 Sizzlers, a 1970s Hot Wheels spin off with a built-in motor and a tiny rechargeable battery

Other uses in arts, entertainment, and media
Sizzler (Brookside), a character on the British television series Brookside
 The Sizzler, a fast-paced celebrity gossip segment on the show Best Week Ever

Brands and enterprises
Sizzler, a restaurant chain in the United States
Sizzler International, a restaurant chain in Australia and Asia
Sizzler Australia, operated by Collins Foods Limited

Technology 
 Sizzler (percussion), an accessory attached to a conventional cymbal to give the effect of a sizzle cymbal
 Sizzler, the supersonic 3M-54E variant of the Russian 3M-54 Klub multi-role missile system
 Heuberger Sizzler, an American homebuilt aircraft design

Other uses
 Sizzler (ride) and Deluxe Sizzler, amusement rides
 Sizzler (food), a term in India used for a type of restaurant or cuisine featuring western-style grilled meats and vegetables served on a hot iron plate (similar to the plate used for fajitas) 
 Sizzler, various Midwestern basketball teams in the Continental Basketball Association
 Sizzler, a micro mini dress with matching panties popular in the 1970s, usually made of polyester 
 Sizzlers massacre, took place in Sea Point, Cape Town on 20 January 2003, when Adam Woest and Trevor Basil murdered nine people and injured one person